Bachelor Pad is an elimination-style two-hour American reality television game show that debuted on August 9, 2010 on ABC. The show features contestants from The Bachelor and The Bachelorette, who compete for a final cash prize of $250,000. Former game show host and news anchor Chris Harrison reprises his role from The Bachelor, while Melissa Rycroft served as special guest co-host for the first season.

In March 2013, it was announced that the program would not return for a fourth season. However, one year later after the show cancelled, it was replaced by Bachelor in Paradise.

Holly Durst and Blake Julian of season 2 were married on June 2, 2012. They are the only Bachelor Pad couple to get married.

About the show
The show stars eleven women and eight men eliminated from various seasons of The Bachelor and The Bachelorette who compete for a $250,000 prize. The women on the first season were mostly from The Bachelor season 14. The men on the first season were mostly from The Bachelorette season 5. The show may also represent "a second chance at finding love" for those rejected by previous Bachelors and Bachelorettes. The contestants live together in a mansion and take part in challenges to prevent elimination, go on dates with contestants of their choice, and choose other contestants to eliminate.

Show format
At the beginning of the season, each contestant privately votes for a person of the opposite sex to be eliminated. Each week, the person with the highest vote count from each sex is eliminated, while a competition winner casts the deciding vote publicly in the event of a tie. In order to advance to the final eight, the sex with the fewest remaining contestants selects partners for competing as couples. A ballroom dancing competition, similar to Dancing with the Stars, is the final competition. Previous Bachelors and Bachelorettes serve as the judges, with the winning couple deciding the couple it will advance to the final vote. The final vote is left to the eliminated contestants who weigh the most deserving couple to be awarded the $250,000 prize. After the final vote, the couple participates in a Prisoner's Dilemma whereby the male contestant and female contestant must decide whether to keep or share the $250,000 prize. The final twist in the show's format is that if both contestants choose to "keep" the grand prize, the monetary prize is evenly distributed amongst the other eliminated contestants.

Season one ended with Natalie and David winning the final vote over Kiptyn and Tenley. The deciding vote was cast by Wes, who opposed David throughout the show. Natalie and David each chose to share the $250,000, thus leaving each with $125,000. Natalie promised to spend the money on repaying student loans and giving vacations to her parents. Natalie and David ended the show as friends, citing geographic constraints, while Kiptyn and Tenley ended the show by referring to each other as boyfriend and girlfriend.

The format made some changes in season three, adding fans into the regular contestant fold of previous Bachelor/Bachelorette contestants.

Season 1 (2010)

Contestants

The game

Elimination chart

Key 

 The contestant is male.
 The contestant is female.

 The contestant won the competition and split the prize.
 The contestant won a challenge and was granted immunity.
 The contestant went on a date and was given a rose by a challenge winner, thus getting immunity.
 The contestant went on a date but was not given a rose on the date.
 The contestant received a rose at the end of the episode, thus remaining in the competition.
 The contestant received the last rose.
 The contestant went on a date and received the last rose. 
 The contestant won a tie-breaker and received the last rose.
 The contestant lost a tie-breaker and was eliminated.
 The contestant went on a date and was eliminated.
 The contestant was eliminated by another contestant/team.
 The contestant was eliminated.

Reception 
Bachelor Pad received mixed reviews from television critics, and currently holds a "mixed or average" 48 out of 100 rating on review aggregate Metacritic.

Season 2 (2011)

Contestants

The game

Elimination table

Key 

 The contestant is male.
 The contestant is female.

12345 Contestants with the same number indicate duos paired up in week 5
 The contestant won the competition and split the prize.
 The contestant won a challenge and was granted immunity.
 The contestant went on a date and was given a rose by a challenge winner, thus getting immunity.
 The contestant went on a date but was not given a rose on the date.
 The contestant received a rose at the end of the episode, thus remaining in the competition.
 The contestant received the last rose.
 The contestant went on a date and received the last rose. 
 The contestant was eliminated by another contestant/team.
 The contestant was eliminated at a challenge
 The contestant went on a date and was eliminated.
 The contestant was eliminated.
 The contestant voluntarily left the show.

Season 3 (2012)

Contestants

The game 

Notes
 Because Jaclyn and Ed both won and Jaclyn took Ed on the first date, they were told to choose a man to get the date rose. That man would be able to ask the woman of his choosing on a date. Jaclyn gave the rose to Chris, who chose to take Sarah on the date.
 Because Blakeley and Tony both won and Blakeley took Tony on a date, they were told to choose a man to get the date rose. That man would be able to ask the woman of his choosing on a date. They gave the rose to Kalon, who chose to take Lindzi on the date.
 Because Chris and Sarah won, they were told to eliminate a couple and chose Tony and Blakeley.
Because Nick chose to keep the money, he won the whole $250,000 and Rachel was eliminated.

Elimination table

Key 

 The contestant is male.
 The contestant is female.

 The contestant won the competition and kept the entire prize for him/herself.
 The contestant won a challenge and was granted immunity.
 The contestant won a challenge and was not granted immunity. They chose whom to eliminate.
 The contestant went on a date and was given a rose by a challenge winner, thus getting immunity.
 The contestant did not go on a date but was given a rose by a challenge winner, thus getting immunity.
 The contestant went on a date but was not given a rose on the date.
 The contestant received a rose at the end of the episode, thus remaining in the competition.
 The contestant received the last rose.
 The contestant went on a date and received the last rose. 
 The contestant was eliminated by another contestant/team.
 The contestant was chosen to be eliminated by the eliminated contestant.
 The contestant was eliminated.
 The contestant voluntarily left the show.

Possible Australian Edition
It has been revealed that an Australian edition of Bachelor Pad is possible as Network Ten is considering expanding its local Bachelor franchise.

References

External links

 
 
 Bachelor Pad at Yahoo! TV

2010s American game shows
American Broadcasting Company original programming
American dating and relationship reality television series
Television series by Warner Horizon Television
2010 American television series debuts
2010s American reality television series
English-language television shows
2012 American television series endings
Television shows filmed in California
American television spin-offs
Reality television spin-offs
Pad